Steve Scott is an Americana musician, producer and actor from New Jersey.

Biography 

Steve was raised by his mother in a poor Irish Catholic single-parent-family in Newark, New Jersey. He grew up with his older siblings: John, Walter and Patricia. Steve Scott's appreciation for music started at an early age heavily influenced by his family members.
The family could not afford a guitar for Scott, but one day he found an old, broken guitar, brought it home, and went to work on it. As a teenager Scott met Peter De Santa, a guitar teacher who became his mentor and inspiration.

Education 

After graduating from high school in Union, New Jersey, where he was nicknamed Lucius by his bluegrass/Deadhead friends, Scott went on to junior college where he studied Theatre Arts. He was later accepted to the NYU Tisch School of the Arts (Circle in the Square Studios) in Manhattan, where he honed his acting skills. Steve went on to graduate from the University of Arizona (Summa Cum Laude) with a bachelor's degree in History/Pre-Law, followed by graduate school where he attended Thomas M. Cooley Law School in Lansing, Michigan.

Acting 

Scott has acted in various productions around the world from Off-Broadway in New York City to feature films in Europe. As an actor Steve used the stage name of Lorenzo Wilde. In 1995 Steve played the role of Captain Pringle in Soldato Ignoto (Unknown Soldier), an Italian film directed by Marcello Aliprandi. In 1996 Scott worked in Celluloide and  Daylight. In 1998 he played the role of a cavalry lieutenant in the Western Gunslinger's Revenge. In 2017 Scott was cast in The Bailout directed by Conall Morrison as Timothy Geithner.

Music 
 Scott was living in his adopted hometown of Detroit. He was originally the lead guitarist of the pop/rock band "The Features" that showcased all over the New York tri-state area. He moved to Michigan to study Law, but eventually went back to music. In 2012, Steve formed Steve Scott Country including musicians from the Detroit metropolitan area. Steve Scott Country's Americana/Country sound encompasses blues, rock and country. He wrote tunes interweaving classic pop/rock arrangements and rhythm sections, with traditional bluegrass instrumentation: a sound he and his band call "Rustbelt Country".

Shinin’ Like You Do 

2012 Shinin’ Like You Do is Scott's solo debut CD, drawing influences from traditional Americana, including a rootsy cover of Rocky Top. The album includes hard-driving country pop rock, spiritual gospels, blues and cowboy ballads.

Scott's older brothers are both Marine combat Veterans who served in Vietnam. When Scott was a child he, his mother, and his sister were affected by the Vietnam experience, while both of his brothers were fighting that war. "Have you ever known a soldier?" has a patriotic theme, and a simple message to all those who have served in the military: Welcome Home!

Those Tears I've Cried 

Scott's 2013 album Those Tears I've Cried is the winner of Outstanding Country Recording Detroit Music Awards 2014. The single "I Think About You" won Detroit Music Awards People's Choice Award 2014. The Album reached No. 11 in the Jambands.com/Relix Magazine Radio Chart; No. 30 in the Roots Music Report Americana Album Chart and No. 1 in the Roots Music Michigan Chart. The album blends country with rock and blues overtones. In 2014, Scott embarked on a tour to promote the CD Those Tears I've Cried to radio stations throughout Europe.

Causes 
Scott donates all the net proceeds from the sale of "Have You Ever Known a Soldier?" to organizations that directly support veterans and their families.
He has worked with three non-for-profit organizations, Operation Ward 57, Wish for Our Heroes and Until Every Troop Comes Home.

Filmography 
 1995 Unknown Soldier: Dir. Marcello Aliprandi, Surf Film Productions with Martin Balsam, Andrea Prodan and Angelo Orlando.
 1996 Daylight: Dir. Rob Cohen, Universal Pictures with Sylvester Stallone and Viggo Mortensen.
 1996 Celluloide (Rome – Open City): Dir. Carlo Lizzani, Dean Film Productions with Giancarlo Giannini, Christopher Walken and Lina Sastri.
 1998 Gunslinger's Revenge: Dir. Giovanni Veronesi, Pacific Pictures/Cecchi Gori Production with Harvey Keitel, David Bowie and Leonardo Pieraccioni
 1999 Excellent Cadavers: Dir. Ricky Tognazzi, HBO Film Production with Chazz Palminteri and Anna Galiena.
 2017 The Bailout: Dir. Conall Morrison, TV3 (Ireland) and Whitefriar Film Productions

Discography 

 Shinin' Like You Do (2012)
 Those Tears I've Cried (2013)

References

External links 

 
 
 BonaVita Records
 Operation Ward 57
 Wish for Our Heroes
 Until Every Troop Comes Home

Year of birth missing (living people)
Living people
American male film actors
American baritones
American country rock musicians
American country rock singers
American country singer-songwriters
Singers from Detroit
American male singer-songwriters
American humanitarians
American people of Irish descent
American country guitarists
American male guitarists
American rock guitarists
American rock singers
University of Arizona alumni
People from Newark, New Jersey
Musicians from Newark, New Jersey
Singer-songwriters from New Jersey
Musicians from Ann Arbor, Michigan
Musicians from Tucson, Arizona
Singer-songwriters from New York (state)
Guitarists from Arizona
Guitarists from Detroit
Guitarists from New Jersey
Guitarists from New York (state)
Catholics from New Jersey
Catholics from Michigan
Country musicians from New York (state)
Country musicians from Arizona
Country musicians from Michigan
Country musicians from New Jersey
20th-century American singers
20th-century American male singers
21st-century American singers
21st-century American male singers
Singer-songwriters from Michigan
Singer-songwriters from Arizona